Article Seven may refer to:

 Article Seven of the United States Constitution
 Article 7 of the European Convention on Human Rights
 Article 7 of the Treaty on European Union, which details the sanctions if the values of the EU are breached by a member state